Ardaas Karaan may refer to:
 Ardaas Karaan (album), 2010
 Ardaas Karaan (film), 2019